Central African Republic–Democratic Republic of the Congo relations refers to the current and historic bilateral relationship between the Central African Republic (CAR) and the Democratic Republic of the Congo (DRC). The two countries are neighbours and share a border 1,747 km long. Due to the military conflicts on both sides of the border, many refugees have crossed into the other's territory. There were about 200,000 Congolese nationals in the Central African Republic as of 2014, and there were around 100,000 Central African refugees in the DRC as of 2016.

The current Congolese ambassador to the Central African Republic is Gaspard Mugaruka, who has been in that office since 2002. Before that the DRC did not have an embassy in CAR for ten years.

Military cooperation

The Armed Forces of the Democratic Republic of the Congo (FARDC) have had peacekeepers in the neighbouring country since at least 2003 due to the ongoing political instability and civil war. During the 2003 Central African Republic coup d'état, there were 370 FARDC troops in Bangui as part of CEMAC peacekeeping mission. As of 2014 there were 850 FARDC soldiers and 150 officers of the Congolese National Police as peacekeepers in CAR due to the civil war that started in 2012.

The two governments also cooperated in dealing with the Lord's Resistance Army insurgency.

See also 
 Foreign relations of the Central African Republic
 Foreign relations of the Democratic Republic of the Congo

References

 
Congo, Democratic Republic of the
Central African Republic